George B Gordon (12 August 1860 – 5 March 1946) was an Australian cricketer. He played five first-class cricket matches for Victoria between 1881 and 1889.

See also
 List of Victoria first-class cricketers

References

External links
 

1860 births
1946 deaths
Australian cricketers
Victoria cricketers
Cricketers from Melbourne